Clement Kengava (born February 7, 1953) is a member of the National Parliament of the Solomon Islands.  He represents a constituency on the island of Choiseul, and has served as Minister for Rural Development and Indigenous Affairs and as Minister for Health and Medical Services.

References
Member page at Parliament website

1953 births
Living people
Members of the National Parliament of the Solomon Islands
People from Choiseul Province
Regional development and local governments ministers
Health ministers of the Solomon Islands